The discography of Welsh singer Bonnie Tyler consists of 18 studio albums, two live albums, four extended plays, 83 singles, and several compilation albums.

After signing to RCA Records, Tyler's first single "My! My! Honeycomb" was released in 1976. Her first charting single was "Lost in France", which reached the Top 10 in the UK. Her most successful single with RCA was "It's a Heartache", which became her first hit in America. The song's sales are in excess of six million.

Tyler released four albums with RCA, and while they charted in mainland Europe and US, she would not make it onto the UK Albums Chart until the release of Faster Than the Speed of Night (1983). It contains Tyler's biggest hit record "Total Eclipse of the Heart", which peaked at number one in several countries including the UK and US. Her 1984 single "Holding Out for a Hero" was also a major hit on both sides of the Atlantic, having featured on the soundtrack to Footloose.

In the 1990s, Tyler continued to have commercial success in Europe. She released three albums with Hansa – Bitterblue (1991), which was certified Platinum four times in Norway, Angel Heart (1992), and Silhouette in Red (1993). She then signed with EastWest and released two albums. Free Spirit (1995) became her first UK and US release since the 1980s. Her next album All in One Voice (1998) failed to chart worldwide. Her 2003 bilingual duet "Si demain... (Turn Around)" with Kareen Antonn became a number one hit in France.

Tyler's subsequent albums, Simply Believe and Wings, were both produced in France. Her 2013 Eurovision Song Contest entry "Believe in Me" became Tyler's first charting single in the UK since 1996. In 2019, Tyler released her seventeenth studio album, Between the Earth and the Stars, which peaked at no. 34 in the UK. Her eighteenth album, The Best Is Yet to Come, followed on 26 February 2021.

Albums

Studio albums

Compilations

Live albums

 A Selected tracks from Bonnie Tyler Live appeared on two digital compilations titled Bonnie and Bonnie Tyler Live+, which were released by Ba-Ba Music in 2017.
 B The CD+DVD edition was reissued by ZYX in 2013 under the title Live & Lost In France. The album was re-released digitally by Peacock Records in 2016 under the title Live in Germany.
 C Track listing is identical to Tyler's 2006 CD release Bonnie Tyler Live.

Extended plays

Singles

As main artist
1970s

1980s

1990s

2000s–2020s

Charity singles

Other album appearances

Soundtracks

Various artist compilation albums

Guest appearances

Footnotes

References

Discography
Discographies of British artists
Rock music discographies
Pop music discographies